A definition is a statement of the meaning of a term.

Definition may also refer to:

Science, mathematics and computing

 In computer programming languages, a declaration that reserves memory for a variable or gives the body of a subroutine
 Defining equation (physics), physical quantities defined in terms of others, in the form of an equation
 Defining equation (physical chemistry), physico-chemical quantities defined in terms of others, in the form of an equation
 Dynamical system (definition), description of a mathematical model, determined by a system of coupled differential equations
 Circular definition, lexicographic, linguistic and logical aspects
 Mathematics:
 Intensional definition
 Elementary definition
 Algebraic definition
 Recursive definition
 Field of definition
 A continuous function
 A well-defined function

Music and TV 
 High-definition television, a television format with higher resolution
 Definition (album), a 1992 studio album by American crossover thrash band Dirty Rotten Imbeciles
 Definition (TV series), a long-running Canadian game show of the 1970s and 1980s
 Definition (Jersey EP), 2001
 Definition (Diaura EP), 2019
 "Definition" (song), a 1998 song by Black Star
 Defined (album), a 2005 operatic pop album
 "Definitions" (How I Met Your Mother), a 2009 television episode

Other 

 Definitions (Plato), a dictionary of about 185 philosophical terms sometimes included in the corpus of Plato's works
 Dogmatic definition, the pronunciation of religious doctrine by a Pope or an ecumenical council